Wyne Su Khine Thein (born 24 December 1986) is a Burmese singer and actress. She is best known for her pleasant voice. Her debut album Mat Lout Sayar was released in 2009 and it was popular among audiences.

Early life and education
Wyne Su was born on 24 December 1986 in Yangon, Myanmar to parents Thein Htay and May Yee Aung. She attended high school at Basic Education High School No. 1 Dagon. She graduated with a degree B.A English from Dagon University.

Career
Wyne began her art work career in 2004. She has acted in over 130 films. Her debut album Mat Lout Sayar was released in 2009 and it was popular among audiences. Her second album Myet Hlae was released in 2011 and it also gained popularity. Then she became one of the most popular female singers in Myanmar. Her third album Ar Bwar was released in 2013. Her fourth album Khar Cha Nay Ya Tal was released in 2015. Her fifth album Gar was released in 2016. Her sixth album Mal Thida was released in 2017. Her seventh album Nwar Kyaung Thu was released in 2019.

Discography

Solo Album
Mat Lout Sayar (မက်လောက်စရာ) (2009)
Myet Hlae (မျက်လှည့်) (2011)
Ar Bwar (အာဘွား) (2013)
Gar (ဂါ) (2016)
Mal Thida (မယ်သီတာ-EP) (2017)
Nwar Kyaung Thu (နွားကျောင်းသူ) (2019)

Duo Album
Khar Cha Nay Ya Tal (ခါချနေရတယ်) (2015)

Filmography

Kaba Sone Hti (2005)
Yadana (2006)

Concerts

List of awards and nominations received by Wine Su Khaing Thein

City FM awards   

|-
| 2010
| rowspan= "5"| Wine Su Khaing Thein
| Best Selling Studio Music Album Female Vocalist of the Year 
| 
|-
| rowspan= "2"| 2013
| Most Popular Female Vocalist of the Year
|   
|-
| The Best Selling Studio Music Album Female Vocalist of the Year
|   
|-
| 2014
| The Best Selling Studio Music Album Female Vocalist of the Year
| 
|-
| 2015
| The Best Selling Studio Music Album Female Vocalist of the Year 
|  
|-
| 2016
| H&M Production
| The Best Selling Studio Music Album Production of the Year
|  
|-
| 2020
| Wine Su Khaing Thein 
| Most Popular Female Vocalist of the Year
|

Shwe FM awards

|-
| rowspan= "2"| 2011
| rowspan= "5"| Wine Su Khaing Thein
| Best Couple song award
|  
|-
| Best Vocalist award
| 
|-
| 2013
| Best Dress award
| 
|-
| 2016
| Best Best Couple Song award 
| 
|-
| 2020
| Most Popular Song award
|   
|-

Padamyar FM awards

|-
| 2011
| Herself
| Artist of the Year
|   
|-

Myanmar Music awards

|-
| 2014
| Herself
| I Love Artist Award of Monsoon
|   
|-

Joox Myanmar Music awards

|-
| 2020
| Herself
| Joox Top 10 Artists of the Year 
| 
|-

Personal life
Wyne was married to Oakar Myint Kyu in 2014 and divorced in 2016.

References

External links

Living people
1986 births
21st-century Burmese actresses
21st-century Burmese women singers
Burmese pop singers
People from Yangon